The Art of Fugue, or The Art of the Fugue, BWV 1080, is an incomplete musical work of unspecified instrumentation by Johann Sebastian Bach. Written in the last decade of his life, The Art of Fugue is the culmination of Bach's experimentation with monothematic instrumental works.

This work consists of fourteen fugues and four canons in D minor, each using some variation of a single principal subject, and generally ordered to increase in complexity. "The governing idea of the work", as put by Bach specialist Christoph Wolff, "was an exploration in depth of the contrapuntal possibilities inherent in a single musical subject." The word "contrapunctus" is often used for each fugue.

Sources

Mus. ms. autogr. P 200

The earliest extant source of the work is an autograph manuscript possibly written from 1740 to 1746, usually referred by its call number as Mus. ms. autogr. P 200 in the Berlin State Library. Bearing the title Die / Kunst der Fuga  / di Sig[nore] Joh. Seb.

The autograph manuscript presents the then-untitled Contrapuncti and canons in the following order: [Contrapunctus 1], [Contrapunctus 3], [Contrapunctus 2], [Contrapunctus 5], [Contrapunctus 9], an early version of [Contrapunctus 10], [Contrapunctus 6], [Contrapunctus 7], Canon in Hypodiapason with its two-stave solution Resolutio Canonis (entitled Canon alla Ottava in the first printed edition), [Contrapunctus 8], [Contrapunctus 11], Canon in Hypodiatesseron, al roversio  e per augmentationem, perpetuus presented in two staves and then on one, [Contrapunctus 12] with the inversus form of the fugue written directly below the rectus form, [Contrapunctus 13] with the same rectus–inversus format, and a two-stave Canon al roverscio et per augmentationem—a second version of Canon in Hypodiatesseron.

Mus. ms. autogr. P 200, Beilage
Bundled with the primary autograph are three supplementary manuscripts, each affixed to a composition that would appear in the first printed edition. Referred to as Mus. ms. autogr. P 200/Beilage 1, Mus. ms. autogr. P 200/Beilage 2, and Mus. ms. autogr. P 200/Beilage 3, they are written under the title Die Kunst / der Fuga / von J.S.B.

Mus. ms. autogr. P 200, Beilage 1 contains a final preparatory revision of the Canon in Hypodiatesseron, under the title Canon p[er] Augmentationem contrario Motu crossed out. The manuscript contains line break and page break information for the engraving process, most of which was transcribed in the first printed edition. Written on the top region of the manuscript is a note written by Johann Christoph Friedrich Bach:

Mus. ms. autogr. P 200, Beilage 2 contains two-keyboard arrangements of Contrapunctus 13 inversus and rectus, entitled Fuga a 2. Clav: and Alio modo Fuga a 2 Clav. in the first printed edition respectively. Like Beilage 1, the manuscript served as a preparatory edition for the first printed edition.

Mus. ms. autogr. P 200, Beilage 3 contains a fragment of a three-subject fugue, which would be later called Fuga a 3 Soggetti in the first printed edition. Unlike the fugues written in the primary autograph, the Fuga is presented in a two-stave keyboard system, instead of five individual staves for each voice. The fugue abruptly breaks off on the fifth page, specifically on the 239th measure and ends with the note written by Carl Philipp Emanuel Bach: "." ("At the point where the composer introduces the name BACH [for which the English notation would be B–A–C–B] in the countersubject to this fugue, the composer died.") The following page contains a list of errata by Carl Philipp Emanuel Bach for the first printed edition (pages 21–35).

First and second printed editions
The first printed version was published under the title Die / Kunst der Fuge / durch / Herrn Johann Sebastian Bach / ehemahligen Capellmeister und Musikdirector zu Leipzig. in May 1751, slightly less than a year after Bach's death. In addition to changes in the order, notation, and material of pieces which appeared in the autograph, it contained two new fugues, two new canons, and three pieces of ostensibly spurious inclusion. A second edition was published in 1752, but differed only in its addition of a preface by Friedrich Wilhelm Marpurg.

In spite of its revisions, the printed edition of 1751 contained a number of glaring editorial errors. The majority of these may be attributed to Bach's relatively sudden death in the midst of publication. Three pieces were included that do not appear to have been part of Bach's intended order: an unrevised (and thus redundant) version of the second double fugue, Contrapunctus X; a two-keyboard arrangement of the first mirror fugue, Contrapunctus XIII; and an organ chorale prelude on "" ("Herewith I come before Thy Throne"), derived from BWV 668a, and noted in the introduction to the edition as a recompense for the work's incompleteness, having purportedly been dictated by Bach on his deathbed.

The anomalous character of the published order and the Unfinished Fugue have engendered a wide variety of theories which attempt to restore the work to the state originally intended by Bach.

Structure

The Art of Fugue is based on a single subject, which each canon and fugue employs in some variation:

The work divides into seven groups, according to each piece's prevailing contrapuntal device; in both editions, these groups and their respective components are generally ordered to increase in complexity. In the order in which they occur in the printed edition of 1751 (without the aforementioned works of spurious inclusion), the groups, and their components are as follows.

Simple fugues:
 Contrapunctus 1: four-voice fugue on principal subject
 Contrapunctus 2: four-voice fugue on principal subject, accompanied by a 'French' style dotted rhythm
 Contrapunctus 3: four-voice fugue on principal subject in inversion, employing intense chromaticism
 Contrapunctus 4: four-voice fugue on principal subject in inversion, employing counter-subjects

Stretto-fugues (counter-fugues), in which the subject is used simultaneously in regular, inverted, augmented, and diminished forms:
 Contrapunctus 5: has many stretto entries, as do Contrapuncti 6 and 7
 Contrapunctus 6, a 4 in Stylo Francese: adds both forms of the theme in diminution, (halving note lengths), with little rising and descending clusters of semiquavers in one voice answered or punctuated by similar groups in demisemiquavers in another, against sustained notes in the accompanying voices. The dotted rhythm, enhanced by these little rising and descending groups, suggests what is called "French style" in Bach's day, hence the name Stylo Francese.
 Contrapunctus 7, a 4 per Augment[ationem] et Diminut[ionem]: uses augmented (doubling all note lengths) and diminished versions of the main subject and its inversion.

Double and triple fugues, employing two and three subjects respectively:
 Contrapunctus 8, a 3: triple fugue with three subjects, having independent expositions
 Contrapunctus 9, a 4, alla Duodecima: double fugue, with two subjects occurring dependently and in invertible counterpoint at the twelfth
 Contrapunctus 10, a 4, alla Decima: double fugue, with two subjects occurring dependently and in invertible counterpoint at the tenth
 Contrapunctus 11, a 4: triple fugue, employing the three subjects of Contrapunctus 8 in inversion

Mirror fugues, in which a piece is notated once and then with voices and counterpoint completely inverted, without violating contrapuntal rules or musicality:
 Contrapunctus inversus 12 a 4 [forma inversa and recta]
 Contrapunctus inversus a 3 [forma recta and inversa]

Canons, labeled by interval and technique:
 Canon per Augmentationem in Contrario Motu: Canon in which the following voice is both inverted and augmented. Three versions have appeared in the autograph Mus. ms. autogr. P 200: Canon in Hypodiatesseron, al roversio  e per augmentationem, perpetuus, Canon al roverscio et per augmentationem, and Canon p. Augmentationem contrario Motu, the third of which appears on the second supplemental Beilage.
 Canon alla Ottava: canon in imitation at the octave; titled Canon in Hypodiapason in Mus. ms. autogr. P 200.
 Canon alla Decima [in] Contrapunto alla Terza: canon in imitation at the tenth
 Canon alla Duodecima in Contrapunto alla Quinta: canon in imitation at the twelfth

Alternate variants and arrangements:
 Contra[punctus] a 4: alternate version of the last 22 bars of Contrapunctus 10.
 Fuga a 2 Clav: and Alio modo. Fuga a 2 Clav.: two-keyboard arrangements of Contrapunctus inversus a 3, the forma inversa and recta, respectively.

Incomplete fugue:
 Fuga a 3 Soggetti: four-voice triple fugue (not completed by Bach, but likely to have become a quadruple fugue: see below), the third subject of which begins with the BACH motif, B–A–C–B ('H' in German letter notation).

Instrumentation
Both editions of the Art of Fugue are written in open score, where each voice is written on its own staff. This has led some to conclude that the Art of Fugue was intended as an intellectual exercise, meant to be studied more than heard. The renowned keyboardist Gustav Leonhardt argued that the Art of Fugue was intended to be played on a keyboard instrument, and specifically the harpsichord. Leonhardt's arguments included the following:
 It was common practice in the 17th and early 18th centuries to publish keyboard pieces in open score, especially those that are contrapuntally complex. Examples include Frescobaldi's Fiori musicali (1635), Samuel Scheidt's Tabulatura Nova (1624), works by Johann Jakob Froberger (1616–1667), Franz Anton Maichelbeck (1702–1750), and others.
The range of none of the ensemble or orchestral instruments of the period corresponds to any of the ranges of the voices in The Art of Fugue. Furthermore, none of the melodic shapes that characterize Bach's ensemble writing are found in the work, and there is no basso continuo.
The fugue types used are reminiscent of the types in The Well-Tempered Clavier, rather than Bach's ensemble fugues; Leonhardt also shows an "optical" resemblance between the fugues of the two collections, and points out other stylistic similarities between them.
Finally, since the bass voice in The Art of Fugue occasionally rises above the tenor, and the tenor becomes the "real" bass, Leonhardt deduces that the bass part was not meant to be doubled at 16-foot pitch, thus eliminating the pipe organ as the intended instrument, leaving the harpsichord as the most logical choice.

It is now generally accepted by scholars that the work was envisioned for keyboard. Despite disagreements on how (and whether) it was intended to be played, The Art of Fugue continues to be performed and recorded by many different solo instruments and ensembles.

Fuga a 3 Soggetti

Fuga a 3 Soggetti ("fugue in three subjects"), also referred to as the "Unfinished Fugue", was contained in a handwritten manuscript bundled with the autograph manuscript Mus. ms. autogr. P 200. It breaks off abruptly in the middle of its third section, with an only partially written measure 239. This autograph carries a note in the handwriting of Carl Philipp Emanuel Bach, stating "Über dieser Fuge, wo der Name B A C H im Contrasubject angebracht worden, ist der Verfasser gestorben." ("While working on this fugue, which introduces the name BACH [for which the English notation would be B–A–C–B] in the countersubject, the composer died.") This account is disputed by modern scholars, as the manuscript is clearly written in Bach's own hand, and thus dates to a time before his deteriorating health and vision would have prevented his ability to write, probably 1748–1749.

Attempts at completion
A number of musicians and musicologists have composed conjectural completions of Contrapunctus XIV which include the fourth subject, including musicologists Donald Tovey (1931), Zoltán Göncz (1992), Yngve Jan Trede (1995), and Thomas Daniel (2010), organists Helmut Walcha, David Goode, Lionel Rogg, and Davitt Moroney (1989), conductor Rudolf Barshai (2010) and Daniil Trifonov (2021). Ferruccio Busoni's Fantasia contrappuntistica is based on Contrapunctus XIV, but it develops Bach's ideas to Busoni's own purposes in Busoni's musical style, rather than working out Bach's thoughts as Bach himself might have done. Other completions that do not incorporate the fourth subject including those by the French classical organist Alexandre Pierre François Boëly and pianist Kimiko Douglass-Ishizaka.

Significance
In 2007, New Zealand organist and conductor Indra Hughes completed a doctoral thesis about the unfinished ending of Contrapunctus XIV, proposing that the work was left unfinished not because Bach died, but as a deliberate choice by Bach to encourage independent efforts at a completion.

Douglas Hofstadter's book Gödel, Escher, Bach discusses the unfinished fugue and Bach's supposed death during composition as a tongue-in-cheek illustration of Austrian logician Kurt Gödel's first incompleteness theorem. According to Gödel, the very power of a "sufficiently powerful" formal mathematical system can be exploited to "undermine" the system, by leading to statements that assert such things as "I cannot be proven in this system". In Hofstadter's discussion, Bach's great compositional talent is used as a metaphor for a "sufficiently powerful" formal system; however, Bach's insertion of his own name "in code" into the fugue is not, even metaphorically, a case of Gödelian self-reference; and Bach's failure to finish his self-referential fugue serves as a metaphor for the unprovability of the Gödelian assertion, and thus for the incompleteness of the formal system.

Sylvestre and Costa reported a mathematical architecture of The Art of Fugue, based on bar counts, which shows that the whole work was conceived on the basis of the Fibonacci series and the golden ratio.

Notable recordings

Harpsichord
 Gustav Leonhardt (1953, 1969)
 Isolde Ahlgrimm (1953, 1967)
 Davitt Moroney (1985)
 Robert Hill (1987, 1998)
 Ton Koopman with Tini Mathot (1994), on two harpsichords
 Bradley Brookshire (2007) includes an additional CD-ROM with score to follow along as MP3s play
 Matteo Messori (2008) alternating three harpsichords (after Taskin,  and Hildebrandt)
 Lorenzo Ghielmi on a Silbermann piano and harpsichord with Vittorio Ghielmi and "Il Suonar Parlante" viols quartet (2009)

Organ
 Helmut Walcha (1956, 1970)
 Glenn Gould (1962) incomplete
 Lionel Rogg (1970)
 Marie-Claire Alain (1974, Rotterdam)
 Wolfgang Rübsam (1992)
 Marie-Claire Alain (1993)
 Louis Thiry (1993) on the Silbermann organ of St Thomas' Church, Strasbourg
 André Isoir (1999) Some movements performed as a duet with Pierre Farago, on the Grenzing organ of Saint-Cyprien in Périgord, France
 Hans Fagius (2000) on the Carsten Lund organ of Garnisons Church Copenhagen, Denmark
 Kevin Bowyer (2001) on the Marcussen organ of Saint Hans Church, Odense, Denmark
 Régis Allard (2007)
 George Ritchie (2010) on the Richards, Fowkes & Co organ of Pinnacle Presbyterian Church in Scottsdale, Arizona (This recording includes as a bonus track an alternative take of the final unfinished fugue with the completion by Helmut Walcha)
 Joan Lippincott (2012)

Piano
 Richard Buhlig and Wesley Kuhnle (1934)
 Glenn Gould, incomplete
 Charles Rosen (1967)
 Grigory Sokolov (1982)
 Zoltán Kocsis (1984)
 Yūji Takahashi (1988)
 Evgeni Koroliov (1991)
 Tatiana Nikolayeva (1992)
 Anton Batagov (1993)
 Joanna MacGregor (1996)
 Ramin Bahrami (2006)
 Pierre-Laurent Aimard (2008)
 Zhu Xiao-Mei (2014)
 Angela Hewitt (2014)
 Schaghajegh Nosrati (2015)
 Kimiko Douglass-Ishizaka (2017)
 Daniil Trifonov (2021)

String quartet
 Quartetto Italiano (1985)
 Juilliard String Quartet (1987)
 Emerson String Quartet (2003)
Vittorio Ghielmi and "Il Suonar Parlante" viols quartet (2009) with Lorenzo Ghielmi on a Silbermann piano and harpsichord

Orchestra
 Arthur Winograd by Winograd String Orchestra (ca 1952)
 Hermann Scherchen with Orchestre de la RTSI (1965)
 Karl Ristenpart with Chamber Orchestra of the Saar (1965)
 Karl Münchinger with Stuttgart Chamber Orchestra (1965, 1985 live)
 Neville Marriner with Academy of St Martin in the Fields (1974)
 Lukas Foss with I Soloisti di Pickup (1977) orchestrated by William Malloch
 Jordi Savall with Hesperion XX (1986)
 Erich Bergel with Cluj Philharmonic Orchestra (1991)
 Rinaldo Alessandrini with Concerto Italiano (1998)
 Stuttgart Chamber Orchestra (2002)
Rachel Podger with Brecon Baroque (2017)

Other
 Milan Munclinger with Ars Rediviva (1959, 1966, 1979)
 Fine Arts String Quartet and New York Woodwind Quintet (1962)
 Yūji Takahashi (incomplete) electronic version (1975)
 Musica Antiqua Köln (director Reinhard Goebel) for string quartet/harpsichord and various such instrumental combinations (1984)
 Canadian Brass for brass quintet (1990)
 Amsterdam Loeki Stardust Quartet for recorder quartet (1998)
 Phantasm (director: Laurence Dreyfus) for viola da gamba four-part consort (1998)
 Pittsburgh Symphony Orchestra Brass (1998)
 Fretwork for Consort of Viols (2002)
 József Eötvös for two eight-string guitars (2002)
  first version on fortepiano (2006)
 An electronic version, Laibachkunstderfuge, by Neue Slowenische Kunst industrial band Laibach (2008)
 Vulfpeck (founder Jack Stratton) for talk box (2016)

See also
List of compositions by Johann Sebastian Bach
List of compositions by Johann Sebastian Bach printed during his lifetime
The Art of Fugue discography

Notes and references

External links

 The Art of Fugue, BWV 1080: performance by the Netherlands Bach Society (video and background information)
 Full discography of The Art of Fugue, bach-cantatas.com
 Discography
 Johann Sebastian Bach / L'art de la fugue / The Art of the Fugue – Jordi Savall, Hesperion XX – Alia Vox 9818
 Piano Society: JS Bach – A biography and various free recordings in MP3 format, including Art of Fugue
 Web-essay on The Art of Fugue
 Introduction to The Art of Fugue
 Die Kunst der Fuge (scores and MIDI files) on the Mutopia Project website
 
 The Art of Fugue as MIDI files
 Image of the ending of the final fugue at external site
 Contrapunctus XIV (the reconstructed quadruple fugue) – Carus-Verlag
 Malina, János: The Ultimate Fugue, The Hungarian Quarterly, Winter 2007
 Contrapunctus XIV (reconstruction): Part 1/2, Part 2/2 (YouTube video)
 Contrapunctus XIV: Completion (in quarter-comma meantone) (YouTube video)
 Contrapunctus II as interactive hypermedia at the BinAural Collaborative Hypertext
 Synthesized realization and analysis of The Art of Fugue by Jeffrey Hall
 Hughes, Indra (2006). "Accident or Design? New Theories on the unfinished Contrapunctus 14 in JS Bach's The Art of Fugue, BWV 1080", The University of Auckland PhD thesis
 "Johann Sebastian Bach's The Art of Fugue", article Uri Golomb, published in Goldberg Early Music Magazine
 Ars Rediviva: Sound Recordings Library, The Art of Fugue, Contrapunctus VIII
 Description of documentary film Desert Fugue
 Electronic realization by Klangspiegel
 Completion of Contrapunctus XIV by Paul Freeman
 Bach, Alphametics and The Art of Fugue
 "Le concert d'Irena Kosikova a fait un tabac", La Dépêche du Midi, 11 August 2014 

Fugues by Johann Sebastian Bach
1750 compositions
Musical compositions completed by others
Bach
Compositions in D minor
Unfinished musical compositions